The 2018 CS Ondrej Nepela Trophy was held on September 2018 at the Ondrej Nepela Arena. It was part of the 2018–19 ISU Challenger Series. Medals were awarded in the disciplines of men's singles, ladies' singles, pair skating, and ice dancing.

Entries
The International Skating Union published the list of entries on August 27, 2018.

Changes to preliminary assignments

Results

Men

Ladies

Pairs
For this category, the 2018 Ondrej Nepela Trophy will be considered as an International Competition only, since the minimum number of entries for a Challenger Series was not reached. In pairs skating, the minimum number of entries is five entries from at least three ISU Members.

Ice dancing

References

External links
 
 26th Ondrej Nepela Trophy at the International Skating Union
 Ondrej Nepela Trophy at the Slovak Figure Skating Association

CS Ondrej Nepela
2018 in Slovak sport